Sabine Braun (born 19 June 1965 in Essen, North Rhine-Westphalia) is a German former athlete in track and field. Because she had talents in several disciplines, Sabine Braun competed in the heptathlon and had a number of successes. Her international sport career began in August 1983 with the European Junior Championships where she won second place.

In 1984 she placed sixth at the XXIII Olympic Summer Games in Los Angeles, California. At the XXV Olympic Summer Games in Barcelona, Spain she won the bronze medal behind Jackie Joyner-Kersee from the United States who won the gold and Irina Belova from Russia representing the Unified Team who won the silver.  She scored 6649 points; her results in the competition were 13.25 s - 1.94 m - 24.27 s - 6.02 m - 51.12 m - 2:14.35 min.

At the World Championships she won gold in 1991 and 1997 and silver in 1993. At the European Championships she twice won gold, in 1990 and then again in 1994, as well as a silver medal in the 2002 competition.

She was the German champion in 1989 and four-time winner at the competitions in Ratingen and Götzis. At the Götzis meet in 1992 she established a German record of 6985 points, which still stands.

Braun represented LAV Düsseldorf, and then in 1987 for LG Bayer Leverkusen and then for TV Wattenscheid. When she was active she was 1.74m tall and weighed 62 kg.  In the fall of 2002 she ended her athletic career as a pro.

Private life 
Sabine Braun is openly lesbian and lives with retired javelin thrower Beate Peters.

References

1965 births
Living people
Athletes (track and field) at the 1984 Summer Olympics
Athletes (track and field) at the 1988 Summer Olympics
Athletes (track and field) at the 1992 Summer Olympics
Athletes (track and field) at the 1996 Summer Olympics
Athletes (track and field) at the 2000 Summer Olympics
German heptathletes
Lesbian sportswomen
LGBT track and field athletes
German LGBT sportspeople
Olympic athletes of Germany
Olympic athletes of West Germany
Olympic bronze medalists for Germany
West German heptathletes
Sportspeople from Essen
World Athletics Championships medalists
European Athletics Championships medalists
World Athletics Championships athletes for Germany
Medalists at the 1992 Summer Olympics
Olympic bronze medalists in athletics (track and field)
Universiade medalists in athletics (track and field)
Universiade silver medalists for West Germany
World Athletics Indoor Championships winners
World Athletics Championships winners
Medalists at the 1989 Summer Universiade
21st-century German LGBT people
German lesbians